The Northeastern Luzon languages is a primary subgroup of the Northern Luzon languages, proposed by Robinson & Lobel (2013) based on historical phonology, functors, and lexicon.

Classification
Robinson & Lobel (2013:148) propose the following internal subgrouping for the Northeastern Luzon languages.

Northeastern Luzon
Dupaningan Agta
(core)
Dinapigue Agta
Casiguran Agta, Nagtipunan Agta
Pahanan Agta, Paranan

References

 
Northern Luzon languages
Aeta languages